When Life Departs (original title: Når livet går sin vej) is a 1997 Danish-Estonian animated short film directed by Stefan Fjeldmark and Karsten Kiilerich.

Summary
The film illustrates the various thoughts children have about death.

Production
The animation was produced at the A. Film A/S headquarters in Tallinn, Estonia, with lead animators Ando Tammik and Meelis Arulepp. It was included in the Animation Show of Shows.

Awards and nominations
 1999: Academy Awards Nominated, Best Animated Short Film
 1998: Silver Poznań Goats for Best Foreign Animation Movie at 16th Ale Kino! Festival
 1998: World Animation Celebration, UNICEF Award
 1997: Corto Imola Festival, Best International Film

See also
 Animated documentary

External links
 When Life Departs at the Internet Movie Database
 When Life Departs at the AWN Oscar Showcase
Excerpt

References

1997 films
1997 animated films
1997 short films
1990s animated short films
1997 documentary films
Estonian animated short films
Animated documentary films
Children and death
Documentary films about death
Films directed by Karsten Kiilerich
Danish animated short films